Air Madagascar was established as Madair on  by Air France and the original 1947-formed Air Madagascar   when it took over the domestic routes operated by these two airlines. Air France and Air Madagascar initially had a 44% and 36% stake in Madair, respectively, while the Malagasy government held the balance. On 20 October 1961, intercontinental services were started, flying a weekly Tananarive–Djibouti–Nice–Paris service using a DC-7 leased from TAI.

Madair changed its name to Air Madagascar in 1963. That year, a regional service to the Comoro Islands was launched using DC-4 equipment. Johannesburg was made part of the route network on 6 August 1967.

By , the carrier operated an extensive domestic network plus regional routes to the Comoro Islands, Johannesburg and Réunion Island and a weekly intercontinental 707 service to Paris via Djibouti and Marseille. Thirty years later, Dzaoudzi, Johannesburg, Mauritius, Moroni, Nairobi, Paris, Rome, Singapore and St. Denis de la Reunion comprised the international list of destinations, whereas Ambanja, Ambatomainty, Ambatondrazaka, Analalava, Ankavandra, Antalaha, Antsalova, Antsiranana, Antsohihy, Belo, Besalampy, Farafangana, Fianarantsoa, Fort Dauphin, Mahanoro, Maintirano, Majunga, Mampikony, Manakara, Mananara, Mananjary, Mandritsara, Manja, Maroansetra, Miandrivazo, Morafenobe, Morombe, Morondava, Nossi-Be, Port Berge, Sambava, Soalala, Ste Marie, Tamatave, Tambohorano, Tsaratanana, Tsiroanomandidy, Tulear, Vatomandry and Vohemar made up the domestic route network. Air Madagascar launched flights to Guangzhou on 6 July 2009.

List
, Air Madagascar operates to the following destinations:

See also

Transport in Madagascar

References

Bibliography

Lists of airline destinations
Airlines established in 1962